Yusuf Abdulazeez (born 9 March 2002) is a Nigerian professional footballer who plays as an attacker for Mjällby AIF in the Allsvenskan.

Career
Abdulazeez played for a local team in his home town of Akure before a move to Zamfara State from where he secured a  move to the Savannah Scorpions of Gombe United, whom he helped to gain promotion to the NPFL in 2020. Playing for Gombe United, Abdulazee finished as the joint second highest scorer in the 2021–22 Nigeria Professional Football League, scoring 16 goals, 3 goals shy of the league top scorer Chijioke Akuneto of Rivers United. 

A transfer to Swedish side Mjällby AIF of the Allsvenskan was agreed in September 2022. He signed a three year deal to keep him in Listerlandet until 2025. He made his league debut for Mjälby on 16 October, 2022 in a 3-0 home defeat against Hammarby Fotboll.

References

External links

2002 births
Living people
People from Akure
Nigerian footballers
Association football forwards
Mjällby AIF players
Allsvenskan players
Nigerian expatriate footballers
Expatriate footballers in Sweden
Nigerian expatriate sportspeople in Sweden